Venera 2 ( meaning Venus 2), also known as 3MV-4 No.4  was a Soviet spacecraft intended to explore Venus. A 3MV-4 spacecraft launched as part of the Venera programme, it failed to return data after flying past Venus.

Venera 2 was launched by a Molniya carrier rocket, flying from Site 31/6 at the Baikonur Cosmodrome. The launch occurred at 05:02 UTC on 12 November 1965, with the first three stages placing the spacecraft and Blok-L upper stage into a low Earth parking orbit before the Blok-L fired to propel Venera 2 into heliocentric orbit bound for Venus, with perihelion of 0.716 AU, aphelion of 1.197 AU, eccentricity of 0.252, inclination of 4.29 degrees and orbital period of 341 days.

The Venera 2 spacecraft was equipped with cameras, as well as a magnetometer, solar and cosmic x-ray detectors, piezoelectric detectors, ion traps, a Geiger counter and receivers to measure cosmic radio emissions.

During the flyby, all of Venera 2's instruments were activated, requiring that radio contact with the spacecraft be suspended. The probe was to have stored data using onboard recorders, and then transmitted it to Earth once contact was restored. Following the flyby the spacecraft failed to reestablish communications with the ground. It was declared lost on 4 March 1966. An investigation into the failure determined that the spacecraft had overheated due to a radiator malfunction.

See also

 List of missions to Venus

References

Spacecraft launched in 1965
1965 in the Soviet Union
Venera program
Derelict satellites in heliocentric orbit
3MV